A Banarasi sari is a sari made in Varanasi, an ancient city which is also called Benares (Banaras).  The saris are among the finest saris in India and are known for their gold and silver brocade or zari, fine silk and opulent embroidery. The saris are made of finely woven silk and are decorated with intricate design, and, because of these engravings, are relatively heavy.

Their special characteristics intricate intertwining floral and foliate motifs, kalga and bel, a string of upright leaves called jhallar at the outer, edge of border is a characteristic of these saris. Other features are gold work, compact weaving, figures with small details, metallic visual effects, pallus, jal (a net like pattern), and mina work.

The saris are often part of an Indian bride's trousseau.

Depending on the intricacy of its designs and patterns, a sari can take from 15 days to a month and sometimes up to six months to complete. Banarasi saris are mostly worn by Indian women on important occasions such as when attending a wedding and are expected to be complemented by the woman's best jewelry.

History

Ralph Fitch (1583–91) describes Banaras as a thriving sector of the cotton textile industry. The earliest mention of the brocade and Zari textiles of Banaras is found in the 19th century. With the migration of silk weavers from Gujarat during the famine of 1603, it is likely that silk brocade weaving started in Banaras in the seventeenth century and developed in excellence during the 18th and 19th century. During the Mughal period, around 14th century, weaving of brocades with intricate designs using gold and silver threads became the specialty of Banaras.

The traditional Banarasi sari is done with cottage industry for about 1.2 million  people associated directly or indirectly with the hand loom silk industry of the region around Varanasi encompassing Gorakhpur, Chandauli, Bhadohi, Jaunpur and Azamgarh districts.

In the last few years, a variety of independent, Varanasi-based brands have emerged to revive the Banarasi sari and bring them directly to mainstream consumers, including Ekaya, Tilfi Banaras, HKV Benaras among others.

Geographical indication

Over the years, the Banarasi silk handloom industry has been incurring huge losses because of competition from mechanised units producing the Varanasi silk saris at a faster rate and at cheaper cost, another source of competition has been saris made of cheaper synthetic alternatives to silk.

In 2009, after two years of wait, weaver associations in Uttar Pradesh, secured Geographical Indication (GI) rights for the ‘Banaras Brocades and saris’. GI is an intellectual property right, which identifies a good as originating in a certain region where a given quality, reputation or other characteristic of the product is essentially attributable to its geographical origin.

As per the GI certificate, Banarasi products fall under four classes (23–26), namely silk brocades, textile goods, silk sari, dress material and silk embroidery. Most importantly this means that no sari or brocade made outside the six identified districts of Uttar Pradesh, that is Varanasi, Mirzapur, Chandauli, Bhadohi, Jaunpur and Azamgarh districts, can be legally sold under the name of Banaras sari and brocade. Prior to this, in July 2007, nine organisations,  Banaras Bunkar Samiti, Human Welfare Association (HWA), joint director industries (eastern zone), director of handlooms and textiles Uttar Pradesh Handloom Fabrics Marketing Cooperative Federation, Eastern UP Exporters Association (EUPEA), Banarasi Vastra Udyog Sangh, Banaras Hath Kargha Vikas Samiti and Adarsh Silk Bunkar Sahkari Samiti,  had applied to the Chennai-based Geographical Indication Registry of Government of India, in a move that was supported by United Nations Conference on Trade and Development (UNCTAD).

Varieties
There are four main varieties of Banarasi sari, which includes pure silk (Katan), Organza (Kora) with Zari and silk; Georgette, and Shattir, and according to design process, they are divided into categories like, Jangla, Tanchoi, Vaskat, Cutwork, Tissue and Butidar

Environmental concern
Since a large number of silk dyeing units in the trade use chemical dyes, which cause pollution in the Ganges River, a move is on to shift to natural dyes. A research team from the Indian Institute of Technology, Banaras Hindu University (IIT-BHU) used the technique of solvent extraction and enzymatic extraction to develop natural colours from plants, flowers and fruits including accaccia, butea (palash), madder, marigold and pomegranate (anar)

Threat to traditional Sari weavers 
The increasingly errant and erratic electric power supply, which leads to the electric powered looms sitting idle for greater parts of the day, has made it difficult for the weavers to complete the saris in short time; consequently their earnings are affected. Also, increasing quantities of look-alike Banarasi saris are flooding the market. These saris are mass-produced in China on massive looms and therefore retail at very low prices.

See also
Bunkar: The Last of the Varanasi Weavers
Silk in the Indian subcontinent
Zari
Pochampally sari
Mysore silk
Ilkal sari
List of fabrics

References

Further reading
 Banaras brocades, by Anand Krishna, Vijay Krishna, All India Handicrafts Board. Ed. Ajit Mookerjee. Crafts Museum, 1966.

External links

 Banarasi sari and Brocades at Varanasi Official website.
Sari/Saree: Banarasi sari – Banglapedia

Economy of Varanasi
Textile arts of India
Culture of Varanasi
Saris
Geographical indications in Uttar Pradesh